Somhlolo National Stadium is a multi-purpose stadium in Lobamba, Eswatini. Built in 1968, it has artificial turf and  holds 20,000 fans (all standing). It is used for football and rugby matches.

The stadium is named for King Somhlolo, who had moved his people into the region that is now Eswatini (Swaziland) about 200 years ago, and is considered the father of the country.

References

External links
Stadium Pictures
Photos of the stadium

Football venues in Eswatini
Athletics (track and field) venues in Eswatini
Eswatini
Multi-purpose stadiums